KRP stands for kinesin related proteins. bimC is a subfamily of KRPs and its function is to separate the duplicated centrosomes during mitosis.

Role in mitotic repair 
Kinesin-13 MCAK (Mitotic Centromere-Associated Kinesin) is a KRP that is involved in resolving errors during mitosis involving kinetochore-microtubules. This process is associated with Aurora B Protein Kinase. When Aurora B's function is disrupted, MCAK ability to locate centromeres, which play a critical role in separation of chromosomes during mitosis, was suppressed. There are other environments in which MCAK's function is impaired, absent impact on its associated kinase. For example, alpha-tubulin detyrosination has been demonstrated to impact MCAK's mitotic repair capabilities, suggesting a potential cause of chromosomal instability.

References 

Proteins